Aegopinella ressmanni is a small species of land snail in the terrestrial pulmonate gastropod mollusk family Gastrodontidae, the glass snails. It is characterized by having a larger shell than other Aegopinella species. The species is distributed in Austria, Czechia, Croatia, Germany, Hungary, Italy, and Slovenia.

References

Gastrodontidae
Gastropods described in 1883